Vincent Lynch may refer to:

 Vincent Lynch (Ulysses), a character in the novel Ulysses by James Joyce
 Vincent Lynch (cyclist) (born 1968), Barbadian cyclist
 Vincent DePaul Lynch (1927–1984), pharmacology and toxicology professor